René Gabriel (14 September 1890 – 30 October 1950) was a French decorative artist and designer who specialized in furniture series (meuble de série).
He had a clean, logical style that inspired many of the new designers in the years after World War II (1939–45). 
The prestigious Prix René Gabriel continues to be awarded to French designers for modern designs that can be mass-produced.

Early career

René Gabriel was born on 14 September 1899</ref> in Maisons-Alfort, Paris.
He studied at the École Germain Pilon from 1912 to 1914, and at the École nationale supérieure des arts décoratifs (ENSAD) from 1914 to 1917.
From 1919 he exhibited furniture and painted designs at the Salon des Artistes Décorateurs and the Salon d'Automne.
Gabriel's sober and rational furniture style resembled that of Francis Jourdain.
At the 1925 International Exposition of Modern Industrial and Decorative Arts in Paris he designed the Chambre de Jeune Fille at the Ambassade Française.

Gabriel also made block-printed wallpaper at his Au Sansonnet workshop in the 1920s.
Later he made wallpaper patterns for Nobilis and Papiers Peints de France.
His designs covered a wide range, and included elegant florals or landscapes and jazzy abstractions.
In 1924 Gabriel became a professor at the École des Arts Appliqués.
He contributed to the Manufacture nationale de Sèvres from 1927.

Last years

After World War II (1939–45) Gabriel had considerable influence through the courses that he gave at ENSAD, and also for his work on the reconstruction of Le Havre, where he was commissioned to design furniture by the architect Auguste Perret.
From 1944 to 1947 he was president of the Société des artistes décorateurs.
He was head of the workshop at the École Nationale Supérieure des Arts Décoratifs from 1946.
In 1949 he was named a knight of the Legion of Honour.
René Gabriel died on 30 October 1950.

Legacy

Gabriel's aesthetic combined elegance with uncompromising rigor.
He inspired the new generation of designers of the 1950s.
Paul Breton, director of the Salon des arts ménagers, created a prize in Gabriel's honor in 1951 to boost mass production of high-quality modern furniture.
The Prix René Gabriel is the most prestigious French design award.
It rewards a designer for innovative and democratic furniture.
Winners have included Marcel Gascoin, Henri Meyer, René-Jean Caillette, Jacques Hauville, the brothers Robert and Jacques Perreau, Roger Landault, Alain Richard, Pierre Gautier Delaye, Pierre Guariche, Marc Berthier, Pierre Paulin, Antoine Philippon and Jacqueline Lecoq, and Pascal Mourgue.

Exhibitions
Gabriel's work was shown in exhibitions that included:
1921: Exposition of French Art in the Rhine
1925: International Exposition of Modern Industrial and Decorative Arts in Paris
1926: Musée Galliera
1930: Antwerp Exposition internationale coloniale, maritime et d'art flamand (carpet)
1933, Exposition of the Manufacture nationale de Sèvres at the Hague (porcelains)
1934: Galeries Bernheim et Charpentier, porcelains 
1934: Salon de la Lumière, furniture sets
1935: Salon des arts ménagers, furniture series
1936: Milan Triennale
1937: Salon des arts ménagers (Children's village, Decorative artists pavilion, School of applied arts
1938: Salon des arts ménagers
1938: Cairo
1939: New York, Pavillon de la France (furniture sets).

Notes

Sources

1890 births
1950 deaths
French decorative artists
French furniture designers
People from Maisons-Alfort